Kim Johannesen may refer to:

 Kim Johannesen (handballer) (born 1979), Danish handball player
 Kim Johannesen (musician) (born 1985), Norwegian jazz musician